One Fine Day is a compilation album by Welsh mezzo-soprano singer Katherine Jenkins. It was released in the United Kingdom on 30 September 2011 as a Digital download and on 3 October 2011 as a CD. It peaked to number 43 on the Irish Albums Chart.

In the Billboard week 21 April 2012 (which was first posted online on 12 April 2012), after Jenkins began to appear on Dancing with the Stars, the album entered the U.S. Classical Albums chart at #22.

Jenkins has explicitly stated that she does not want fans to buy this album, which contains no new material and was released by her previous record company, out of her control.

Track listing

Chart performance

It also charted at #21 on the Billboard U.S. Classical Albums chart for the "Week of May 26, 2012" and at #22 on that chart for the "Week of April 21, 2012"

Certifications

Release history

References

Katherine Jenkins albums
2011 albums